Star Wars: The Clone Wars – Lightsaber Duels is a Wii fighting video game based on Star Wars: The Clone Wars, and is the second Star Wars fighting game released, following Star Wars: Masters of Teräs Käsi.  The game was released on November 11, 2008 to coincide with the start of the series' first season.  It features the same voice actors to reprise their roles from the show, such as Ashley Eckstein, Matt Lanter, James Arnold Taylor, Matthew Wood, Corey Burton, Nika Futterman, Tom Kane, Phil LaMarr, and Terrence Carson.  A companion game, Star Wars: The Clone Wars – Jedi Alliance, was released on the Nintendo DS on the same day.

Plot 
The events of the game's "Campaign Mode" take place during the film and select episodes from the first season of the television series, specifically "Duel of the Droids", "Cloak of Darkness", "Shadow of Malevolence", and "Destroy Malevolence" (in that order), finishing with a scenario original to the game.

Characters
Ahsoka Tano
Anakin Skywalker
Asajj Ventress
Count Dooku
EG-5
General Grievous
Kit Fisto
Mace Windu
Obi-Wan Kenobi
Plo Koon

Gameplay 
Lightsaber Duels makes use of the Wii Remote to simulate lightsaber combat. Players also use the Nunchuk to utilize Force powers to enhance their strength and manipulate objects in the duel arena while playing as a Jedi or Sith.  Duels are fought one-on-one, with four levels of difficulty themed after the ranks of the Jedi Order for single-player battles against an opponent controlled by artificial intelligence.  Each character has different attack combos, triggered by inputting a series of several Wii Remote gestures without interruption.   Quick time events can also occur during a duel that a player can win by performing the correct gestures to deliver extra damage to the opponent.  Duels are fought as a best-of-three series, implemented with dual health bars that deplete one after the other, similar to Killer Instinct, although the winner fully replenishes their current health bar when a round ends with one of the loser's health bars being fully depleted.

In "Campaign Mode", the player can only fight as Anakin Skywalker, Obi-Wan Kenobi and Ahsoka Tano, each in their costumes from the series. They battle against Asajj Ventress, Count Dooku, and General Grievous, plus a Jedi Hunter, named EG-5, a droid that is programmed to use a lightsaber.

In "Challenge Mode", the player is given the choice to play as any character in the game currently unlocked, and enter a series of duels in which specific goals are set. If they are met, a blue Republic symbol will appear at the end of the duel. Each character has four challenges. Some challenges are more difficult than others, but they unlock characters and some battlefields as well.

Reception
Star Wars The Clone Wars: Lightsaber Duels received mixed reviews according to review aggregator Metacritic.

See also
Star Wars: Masters of Teräs Käsi

References

External links 
 
Star Wars: The Clone Wars -- Lightsaber Duels on Mobygames

2008 video games
Lightsaber Duels
Krome Studios games
Wii-only games
Wii games
Video games developed in Australia
Multiplayer and single-player video games